Shems FM (Arabic: شمس أف أم) is the fourth-launched private radio station in Tunisia. It was launched on September 27, 2010, by 12 p.m. local time and it is owned by Cyrine Ben Ali Mabrouk, the daughter of Zine el-Abidine Ben Ali -the former president of Tunisia- and the wife of prominent businessman Marouen Mabrouk. It includes a team of 30 radio show hosts.
Shems FM was fully or partially funded by the Tunisian Government.

Key people 
 Fathi Bhoury, Director General
 Lotfi Zeghdana, Deputy Director
 Amel Smaoui, Head of Programming

See also 
 Express FM

References

External links 
 

Radio stations in Tunisia